Scotstown is a village in County Monaghan, Ireland

Scotstown may also refer to:

Scotstown, Quebec, a city in Quebec, Canada
Scotstown, County Tyrone, a townland in County Tyrone, Northern Ireland

See also
Scotstown Moor, a nature reserve in Aberdeen, Scotland
Scotstown Primary School